Polenius is the name of:
the English theologian Robert Pullen
a 17th-century abbot of Kamp Abbey